Blankenhorn is a surname. Notable people with the surname include:

 David Blankenhorn (born 1955), American same-sex marriage opponent turned advocate
 Heber Blankenhorn (1884–1956), American journalist and union activist 
 Herbert Blankenhorn (1904–1991), German diplomat
 Travis Blankenhorn (born 1996), American baseball player